Erdenebatyn Tsendbaatar (born 16 October 1996) is a Mongolian boxer. He competed in the bantamweight event at the 2016 Summer Olympics, but was eliminated in the third bout. He won a gold medal at the 2018 Asian Games

References

External links

 

1996 births
Living people
Mongolian male boxers
Olympic boxers of Mongolia
Boxers at the 2016 Summer Olympics
AIBA World Boxing Championships medalists
Asian Games medalists in boxing
Boxers at the 2018 Asian Games
Asian Games gold medalists for Mongolia
Medalists at the 2018 Asian Games
People from Arkhangai Province
Featherweight boxers
Boxers at the 2020 Summer Olympics
21st-century Mongolian people